Rainer Ohlhauser (born 6 January 1941 in Dilsberg, Rhein-Neckar-Kreis) is a German former footballer who played as a striker during the 1960s and 1970s.

Ohlhauser began his career with SV Sandhausen in 1958 before moving to FC Bayern Munich in 1961. He had enormous success at Bayern, playing almost three hundred matches and scoring 186 goals. He also won a number of trophies, including the UEFA Cup Winners' Cup in 1967 and the Bundesliga in 1969. In 1970, he signed for Grasshopper Club Zürich of Switzerland, switching position to midfielder. He retired after five years with Grasshopper and also went on to manage FC Winterthur and FC Basel between 1982 and 1983.

Despite his scoring record, he picked up just one international cap for West Germany, in 1968.

Honours
 UEFA Cup Winners' Cup winner: 1966–67
 Bundesliga champion: 1968–69
 Bundesliga runner-up: 1969–70
 DFB-Pokal winner: 1965–66, 1966–67, 1968–69

References

External links
 

1941 births
Living people
German footballers
Germany international footballers
German football managers
Bundesliga players
SV Sandhausen players
FC Bayern Munich footballers
Grasshopper Club Zürich players
FC Basel managers
FC Winterthur managers
Association football midfielders
Association football forwards
People from Rhein-Neckar-Kreis
Sportspeople from Karlsruhe (region)
Footballers from Baden-Württemberg
West German footballers
West German expatriate footballers
West German expatriate football managers
West German football managers
West German expatriate sportspeople in Switzerland
Expatriate footballers in Switzerland
Expatriate football managers in Switzerland